Gillett may refer to:

Places in the United States
Gillett, Arizona, a ghost town and former mining settlement
Gillett, Arkansas
Gillett, Wisconsin
Gillett (town), Wisconsin
Gillett, Texas
Gillett Grove, Iowa

Other uses
Gillett (surname)

See also
Penn Jillette (born 1955), American magician and writer 
Gillette (disambiguation)